Beartown may refer to:

Geography
 Beartown State Forest, a forest located in the towns of Great Barrington, Monterey, Lee, and Tyringham, Massachusetts, in the United States
 Beartown State Park, a state park located in Droop Mountain, in northern Greenbrier County, West Virginia, in the United States
 Beartown Mountain, a mountain located in the Clinch Mountain range, which is in eastern Russell County, Virginia, in the United States
 Balsam Beartown Mountain, a mountain located in Tazewell County, Virginia, in the United States
 Beartown Wilderness, a wilderness area in the George Washington and Jefferson National Forests, in Tazewell County, Virginia, in the United States
 Beartown Wilderness Addition A, a wildland in the George Washington and Jefferson National Forests of western Virginia, in the United States
 Beartown Wilderness Addition B, a wildland in the George Washington and Jefferson National Forests of western Virginia, in the United States

Communities
 Congleton is a town and civil parish in Cheshire, England, in the United Kingdom, nicknamed Beartown
 Beartown, New York, a hamlet located on Beartown Road in the Town of Western in Oneida County, New York, in the United States
 Beartown, West Virginia, an unincorporated community located in McDowell County, West Virginia, in the United States
 Beartown, Lancaster County, Pennsylvania, is an unincorporated community in Caernarvon Township in Lancaster County, Pennsylvania, in the United States

Surname 
Its Norwegian literal translation, Bjørnstad, is a family name

Other 
 Beartown (novel), a novel by Swedish writer Fredrik Backman